Carl Arthur Goresky, OC (August 25, 1932 – March 21, 1996) was a Canadian physician and scientist at the Montreal General Hospital. His theoretical treatment of the transport of substances through intact organs, which formed the basis of his PhD thesis, led the basis for the understanding of events within the microvasculature.

In November 1995, Goresky was inducted into the Order of Canada as Officer.

Selected publications

References
 

1932 births
1996 deaths
Canadian medical researchers
Canadian physiologists
Officers of the Order of Canada
Academic staff of McGill University
Anglophone Quebec people
Physicians of Montreal General Hospital